"Flamenco" is a song by Canadian rock group The Tragically Hip. It was released in January 1997 as the fourth single from their fifth studio album, Trouble at the Henhouse. The song peaked at number 12 on Canada's RPM Singles Chart.

Charts

Weekly charts

Year-end charts

References

1997 singles
The Tragically Hip songs
1996 songs